Events from the year 1995 in Algeria.

Incumbents
President: Liamine Zéroual
Prime Minister: Mokdad Sifi (until 31 December), Ahmed Ouyahia (starting 31 December)

Events

Births

 April 2 – Abdou Nef, footballer (died 2013)
August 10 - Saïd Benrahma, footballer

Deaths

References

 
1990s in Algeria